Hinkel is the surname of:
Andreas Hinkel (born 1982), German footballer
Arthur Hinkel (1916–1993), American electrical engineer
Hans Hinkel (1901–1960), German journalist
Roy Henkel (1905–1981), Canadian ice hockey player whose surname is often seen as "Hinkel"
Volker Hinkel (born 1965), German guitarist and pianist, member of the band Fools Garden
Adenoid Hynkel, villain of Charlie Chaplin's film The Great Dictator

Surnames from given names